Admiralty most often refers to:

Admiralty, Hong Kong
Admiralty (United Kingdom), military department in command of the Royal Navy from 1707 to 1964
The rank of admiral
Admiralty law

Admiralty can also refer to:

Buildings

Admiralty, Trafalgar Square, a pub in London
Admiralty, Saint Petersburg, Russia
 Admiralteyskaya (Saint Petersburg Metro), a metro station in Saint Petersburg, Russia, the name means "Admiralty"
Admiralty Arch in London, England 
Admiralty House, London
Admiralty House, Sydney
Dutch Admiralty, a group of follies at Tsarskoye Selo, Russia
Former Admiralty House, Singapore

Law
 Admiralty court
 Admiralty law, also called Maritime Law
 Amirauté (New France)

Naval organizations
Admiralty (navy), a governmental and/or naval body responsible for the administration of a navy

Germany
 German Imperial Admiralty, Kaiserliche Admiralität
 German Imperial Admiralty Staff, Admiralstab

Netherlands
Admiralty of Amsterdam
Admiralty of Friesland
Admiralty of the Noorderkwartier (also called the "Admiralty of West-Friesland")
Admiralty of Rotterdam (also called the "Admiralty of de Maze")
Admiralty of Zeeland

Russia
Admiralty Board (Russian Empire), the authority responsible for the Imperial Russian Navy
Admiralty Shipyard, a former Imperial admiralty, the Main Admiralty, today a shipyard in Saint Petersburg, Russia

United Kingdom and earlier states
Admiralty in the 16th century, the Admiralty and Marine Affairs Office (1546–1707) 
Board of Admiralty, the board responsible for the Royal Navy from 1628 to 1964
Admiralty (United Kingdom), a former military department in command of the Royal Navy from 1707 to 1964
Admiralty Board (United Kingdom), the post-1964 board responsible for the Royal Navy
Royal Maritime Auxiliary Service, commonly referred to as the Admiralty
United Kingdom Hydrographic Office, produces the Admiralty brand of charts

Places
Admiralty Bay (disambiguation), multiple bodies of water
Admiralty, Hong Kong, an urban area on Hong Kong Island named after the naval base HMS Tamar
Admiralty station (MTR), the MTR station serving the area
Admiralty, Singapore, a suburban neighbourhood in Singapore
Admiralty MRT station, the MRT station serving the area
Admiralty Inlet, Washington, United States
Admiralty Island, Alaska, United States
Admiralty Islands, a part of the Manus Province of Papua New Guinea
Admiralty Mountains in Victoria Land of Antarctica
Qikiqtagafaaluk, formerly Admiralty Island, Nunavut, Canada

Ships and shipping
 , the name of two yachts of the Royal Navy
 , a 1944 United States Navy aircraft carrier

Other uses
 Admiralty brass, contains 30% zinc and 1% tin which inhibits dezincification in most environments
 Admiralty chart, a brand of nautical chart
 Admiralty scaffolding, a military barrier

See also
Admiral
Admiralteysky (disambiguation)